Real to Reel is the fourth studio album by American progressive rock band Starcastle. It was their final release on Epic Records.

Reception
Real to Reel marked a drastic change of direction from their previous progressive rock efforts to a more album-oriented rock sound. It was a commercial failure, generally panned by critics and fans alike  and ultimately led to Starcastle disbanding. Bassist Gary Strater moved to San Francisco before forming a new version of the band in 1985 that featured future Vicious Rumors guitarist Mark McGee.

Track listing
All songs written by Starcastle, except where noted.

 "Half a Mind to Leave Ya" - 4:48
 "Whatcha Gonna Do (When It All Comes Down On You)" - 3:33
 "We Did It" - 3:54
 "Nobody's Fool" - 4:00 (J. Lesser and Starcastle)
 "Song For Alaya" - 3:06
 "So Here We Are" - 3:57 (J. Lesser and Starcastle)
 "She" - 3:43 (J. Lesser and Starcastle)
 "The Stars Are Out Tonight" - 3:53
 "When The Sun Shines At Midnight" - 6:16

Personnel 
Starcastle
Terry Luttrell - lead vocals (except on "Song For Alaya")
Stephen Hagler - lead vocals (on "Song For Alaya"), backing vocals, electric guitar, piano
Matthew Stewart - backing vocals, electric guitar, slide guitar, electric sitar
Gary Strater - backing vocals, bass guitar, clavinet
Herb Schildt - piano, synthesizer, organ, string arrangements
Stephen Tassler - backing vocals, drums, percussion

Production Staff
 Engineering and mixing - Jeffrey Lesser and Tom Pye
 Assistant engineer - Rick Sanchez
 Personal direction - Artistic Vision LTD, Irv Zuckerman, Steve Schankman, Paul Tassler
 Photography - Bob Seidemann

References

1978 albums
Starcastle albums
Epic Records albums